Ruhul Amin (born 1971) is a Bangladeshi-born British film director.

Early life
Amin was born in Sylhet District, Bangladesh, and came to Britain with his parents in the early 1980s while he was a teenager. While he was at school, he made his first documentary-drama, Prubo London. He attended the National Film and Television School.

Career
In 1986, Amin made his first feature film for Channel 4 television entitled A Kind of English.

Amin has made 15 films for the BBC and Channel 4. Most of them are documentaries and experimental dramas. He is currently making an epic Bengali feature film Hason Raja based on the based on the life and music of the folk poet, mystic philosopher and songwriter of the same name played by Mithun Chakraborty, produced by Galaxy Films between UK, India and Bangladesh. The film was funded by Amin's friends and the Bangladeshi community in England.

Amin is known for creating sensitive, understated, poetic films centred on the life of the Bengali community in the East End of London.

Filmography

References

External links

1971 births
Living people
Date of birth missing (living people)
Bangladeshi emigrants to England
British people of Bangladeshi descent
Film directors from London
People from Sylhet District
Alumni of the National Film and Television School